Acalolepta marianarum is a species of beetle in the family Cerambycidae. It was described by Per Olof Christopher Aurivillius in 1908, originally under the genus Monochamus. It is known from the Mariana Islands. It feeds on Theobroma cacao, Mangifera indica, and Artocarpus altilis.

References

Acalolepta
Beetles described in 1908